Dale Wood may refer to:

 Dale Wood (composer) (1934–2003), American composer, organist, and choral director
 Dale Wood (racing driver) (born 1983), Australian racing driver

See also
 Wood Dale, Illinois, a city in Addison Township, DuPage County, Illinois, United States